Calloway is an R&B duo of Cincinnati, Ohio brothers Reggie (born on January 23, 1955) and Vincent (born on January 5, 1957) Calloway. They had a major hit in 1990 with "I Wanna Be Rich".

Biography
The brothers grew up around music with a father who played the trumpet, an uncle who played keyboards, and an aunt who sang opera. As teenagers, they began writing songs and forming bands, and when attending Kentucky State University, they formed Midnight Star, a synth-funk outfit that hit big in the early to mid 1980s. The Calloways were instrumental in orchestrating the band's 1983 multi-platinum breakthrough album, No Parking on the Dance Floor, and Midnight Star would continue to experience mainstream success throughout the brothers' tenure in the group.

After Midnight Star ran its course, the two left to focus on solo work. During their time with Midnight Star, they had also written and produced hits for acts like Klymaxx ("Meeting in the Ladies Room") and The Whispers ("Contagious"). Following their exit from Star, they continued writing for other musicians, such as Teddy Pendergrass ("Joy"), Gladys Knight & the Pips ("Love Overboard"), Natalie Cole ("Jump Start"), and Levert ("Casanova"), before forming their own eponymous group, Calloway, in the late 1980s. As Calloway, the duo scored a number two Billboard Hot 100 hit and number five soul hit with "I Wanna Be Rich". After scoring with the follow-ups "Sir Lancelot" (Top 20 R&B), "All the Way" and "Let's Get Smooth" (both R&B Top 40 hits), the hits dried up and the Calloways concentrated on production work. Reginald Calloway is now the Music Director of Royalty fund for Sound Royalties.

Discography

Albums

Singles

References

External links
 Calloway at Discogs.

American pop music groups
American contemporary R&B musical groups
Sibling musical duos
American musical duos
Contemporary R&B duos
SOLAR Records artists
Epic Records artists
Musical groups established in 1987